Groton  is a town in New London County, Connecticut located on the Thames River. It is the home of General Dynamics Electric Boat, which is the major contractor for submarine work for the United States Navy. The Naval Submarine Base New London is located in Groton, and the pharmaceutical company Pfizer is also a major employer. Avery Point in Groton is home to a regional campus of the University of Connecticut. The population was 38,411 at the 2020 census.

History

Groton was established in 1705 when it separated from New London, Connecticut. The town was named after Groton, Suffolk in England. A hundred years before it was established, the Niantic people settled in the area between the Thames River and Pawcatuck River, but they eventually settled in Westerly, Rhode Island. The newcomers to the land were the Pequots, a branch of the Mohawk people who moved eastward into the Connecticut River Valley.

The summer of 1614 was the first time that the Pequots encountered white settlers. They started trading furs for the settlers' goods, such as steel knives, needles, and boots. In 1633, the Dutch bought land from them and opened a fur trading post. Meanwhile, the English bought land for settlement from the local tribes. The Dutch had unintentionally killed the Pequots' chief, and this prompted revenge by the Pequot tribe, and this escalated into the Pequot War (1636–1638). On the night of May 26, 1637, the Colonial forces arrived outside the Pequot village near the Mystic River. The palisade surrounding the village had only two exits, and their leader Colonel John Mason gave the order to set the village on fire and block off the exits. Those who tried climbing over the palisade were shot; anyone who succeeded in getting over was killed by the Narragansett forces.

The land was poor for farming, but access to the region's waterways left room for commerce and trade, and Groton became a town of oceangoing settlers. Most of the community began to build ships, and soon traders made their way to Massachusetts Bay Colony and Plymouth Colony to trade for food, tools, weapons, and clothing. John Leeds was the earliest shipbuilder, coming as a sea captain from Kent, England. He built a 20-ton brigantine, a two-masted sailing ship with square-rigged sails on the foremast and fore-and-aft sails on the mainmast. Thomas Starr built a 67-ton square-sterned vessel, and Thomas Latham launched a 100-ton brig on the Groton bank with mast standing and fully rigged. The sturdy ships built in Groton engaged in highly profitable trade with the islands of the Caribbean.

American Revolution

On September 6, 1781, the Battle of Groton Heights was fought between a combined force of state troops and local militia led by William Ledyard and numerous British forces led by Benedict Arnold. No one at Fort Griswold had expected an attack, especially after six years of false alarms. At sunrise, a force of 1,700 British regulars landed on both sides of the mouth of the Thames River. The fleet had sailed from Long Island the evening before, and only a sudden shift in the wind prevented a surprise attack during the night; it was 9 a.m. the next day before the transports could come ashore to land the troops.

Across the Thames River in New London, Benedict Arnold was leading an 800-man detachment which destroyed stockpiles of goods and naval stores. His men set fire to a ship containing gunpowder which created an uncontrollable fire that destroyed most of New London. Meanwhile, a British force of 800 men moved toward Fort Griswold in Groton, which was garrisoned by 164 militia and local men. The British sent a flag of surrender to Fort Griswold, but Colonel William Ledyard refused and returned it. The British then attacked, initiating the Battle of Groton Heights. After an initial repulse, the British succeeded in entering the fort and overpowering the small garrison inside. Ledyard realized that his men were overpowered and surrendered to the British—who proceeded to kill Ledyard with his own sword and continue firing on the American garrison. Jonathan Rathbun described the surrender this way:

The wretch who murdered him [Ledyard], exclaimed, as he came near, "Who commands this fort?" Ledyard handsomely replied, "I did, but you do now," at the same moment handing him his sword, which the unfeeling villain buried in his breast! Oh, the hellish spite and madness of a man that will murder a reasonable and noble-hearted officer, in the act of submitting and surrendering!

A memorial for the battle was erected in 1830 for the 85 Patriot soldiers who were killed at the fort. Fort Griswold is the only intact memorial in town left from the Revolutionary War. The  monument has become the town's symbol and is now featured on the Groton town seal.

Early 19th century 

Shortly after the Revolutionary War, Groton started to re-establish its commercial activities. Shipbuilders began to build again; Victory was launched in 1784, Success was launched in 1785, and five sloops were built in 1787, along with the 164-ton Nancy. Shipbuilders along the Mystic River were the busiest. These ships went on trips to Florida, and the resulting profits made Mystic the most thriving part of the town.

Between 1784 and 1800, 32 vessels were built in Groton. 28 more were built from 1800 to 1807, when business came to a sudden stop with the Embargo Act. In June 1812, the United States declared war on Great Britain. Most of the United States' small navy was landlocked in the Thames River. This frightened the people in Groton for fear that there would be a repeat of the Groton Heights massacre of 1781, and many residents fled inland for safety. Those that did not flee demanded protection and militia. These residents built a fort on a hill of rock that held one cannon and maintained constant guard. The fort was named Fort Rachel, after a woman that lived nearby. The British never attacked but created a blockade that ruined Groton's trade.

Some men from Mystic lured a British barge to Groton Long Point on August 12, 1814, the day after the British attacked Stonington, gaining themselves 2,600 dollars in prize money. The men in Mystic captured a sloop, the cargo of which they later sold for 6,000 dollars. Seventeen Mystic men also tried out a new weapon called the spar torpedo to rid themselves of the British blockade. The men failed to sink . On their first attempt, the torpedo went into the water; on the second attempt, the explosive caught on Ramillies cable and exploded. All the men made it safely to the shore while being fired at by the British ship and the American sentries at Eastern Point.

Groton received word that the war was over on February 21, 1815. The land-locked frigates left the Thames in April, leaving Groton to resume its marine pursuits.

After the War of 1812, whaling became a very important part of Groton's economy, but most of the expeditions were still for seal skins. Before 1820, sealers went to Antarctica, where their ships would drop them off. They would kill the seals and then prepare the skins for some weeks, until their ship returned for them. By 1830, whaling had become Mystic's main business. By 1846, Groton became one of the world's prime whaling ports. Whaling was difficult and dangerous, but boys would go out to sea to make their fortune, nonetheless, in the hope that some of them would eventually come to command a vessel.

In 1865, Ebenezer Morgan made one of the most profitable voyages. He sold his cargo for $150,000. Three years later, he raised the first American flag on Alaskan territory, and there he collected 45,000 seal skins. When he retired, it was said that his estate totaled up to $1 million.

William H. Allen, another son of Groton, spent 25 years commanding a whale ship. Old sailors said that "whales rose to the surface and waited to be harpooned." When he retired, he spent 12 years working as a selectman.

Late 19th century 

In 1849, the discovery of gold in California created a demand for speed that resulted in the creation of the clipper ship, a fast sailing ship with multiple masts and a square rig. The most important vessel built at the Mystic River Shipyard was the clipper ship Andrew Jackson. In 1859, it sailed from New York City to San Francisco in a record time of 89 days and 4 hours. Both clippers and sailing packets were built in the shipyards of the Mystic River at that time. The Mystic shipyards started building ships with a greater cargo capacity after the Civil War.

Gideon Welles, Secretary of the Navy during the Civil War, wanted three experimental ironclad steamers to be built in private shipyards and used against the Confederacy's wooden fleet. A company in Groton was chosen to build a bomb-proof steamer designed by C.S. Bushnell of New Haven. 100 men were hired, and a big shed was built so that construction could continue rain or shine. The ship was ready for launching in 130 days. There were many skeptics who believed that the ship would sink or corrode once it hit the salt water, and there were very few who thought that it might float. Thousands came to watch 's launch on Valentine's Day 1862. Reporters commented that she floated like a duck. When it came time for Galena to enter battle, she was pierced 13 times. Thirteen of the crew members were killed and 11 were wounded from flying metal fragments. During the Civil War, 56 steamships were built for government service in shipyards on both sides of the Mystic River.

After the war, there were dozens of excess war steamships and, after 1870, shipbuilding moved up to Noank within the Groton town limits. One of the largest shipyards was Palmer Shipyard, established in Noank in 1827. A marine railway built in Groton in 1860 allowed them to pull vessels out of the water for repairs, which brought in a lot of business and money. The shipyard was running up to 1913 when one of the Palmer brothers died, but during World War I the shipyard was used again. Iron ships began to be demanded, and their construction attracted workers to Groton. Housing was beginning to run short, so Groton Realty had to hurry to build hotels and cottages. The ships which brought the workers in turn also brought more business to the Realty.

The Naval Submarine Base New London was founded in Groton in 1872 as the New London Navy Yard. Submarines were first based there in 1915, and in 1916 it was officially renamed a submarine base.

Groton used to include what is now the town of Ledyard, which separated from Groton in 1836. The original center of Groton is still known as Center Groton at the present-day intersection of Route 184 and Route 117, now in the north-central part of town, due to the departure of Ledyard to the north. Groton Center was the location of the town's first school, church, tavern, and stagecoach shop.

20th century

In the 20th century, the shipbuilding industry moved from the Mystic River to the Thames River. Electric Boat is the town's largest employer. However, until 1931, submarines designed by Electric Boat were subcontracted to other shipyards, primarily Fore River Shipbuilding in Quincy, Massachusetts. Electric Boat commenced industrial operations in Groton with the establishment of the New London Ship and Engine Company (NELSECO) as a subsidiary in 1911. NELSECO was the primary engine manufacturer for Electric Boat-designed submarines 1911–1925. In 1931,  was laid down as the first submarine built in Groton. During World War II, Electric Boat completed submarines every two weeks.

In 1954, Electric Boat launched , the world's first nuclear-powered submarine. Presently, Nautilus is decommissioned and open for visitors, permanently berthed at the U.S. Navy Submarine Force Library and Museum. Groton is sometimes referred to as the "Submarine Capital of the World," due to the long-standing history of submarines in the town, and the fact that Groton has one of the largest submarine bases in the world.

The Groton and Stonington Street Railway was a trolley line that was created in 1904 to serve the Groton area. The trolley was dismantled and replaced by buses in 1928.

Geography

Principal communities

 Burnett's Corner — historic district located along Packer Road south of Route 184
 Center Groton
 City of Groton — located along the Thames River
 Groton Heights or Groton Bank — historic district in the northern part of the city area
 Groton Long Point
 Long Hill
 Mystic (06355) — primarily in the neighboring town of Stonington, but a small portion (West Mystic) is in Groton
 Noank
 Old Mystic
 Poquonnock Bridge
 Fort Hill
 Submarine Base area (Census designation: "Conning Towers-Nautilus Park")

Other minor communities and geographic features are Bluff Point, Eastern Point, Esker Point, Jupiter Point, Mumford Cove, and West Pleasant Valley.

Climate 
Groton has a humid continental climate (Dfb).

Demographics

As of the census of 2000, there were 39,907 people, 15,473 households, and 9,980 families residing in the town. The racial makeup of the town was 83.61% White, 6.95% Black or African American, 0.83% Native American, 3.33% Asian, 0.17% Pacific Islander, 1.66% from other races, and 3.45% from two or more races. Hispanic or Latino of any race were 5.01% of the population.

There were 15,473 households, out of which 33.4% had children under the age of 18 living with them, 50.5% were married couples living together, 10.5% had a female householder with no husband present, and 35.5% were non-families. 29.2% of all households were made up of individuals, and 9.5% had someone living alone who was 65 years of age or older. The average household size was 2.41 and the average family size was 2.99.

In the town, the age distribution of the population shows 24.8% under the age of 18, 11.8% from 18 to 24, 33.0% from 25 to 44, 18.3% from 45 to 64, and 12.1% who were 65 years of age or older. The median age was 32 years. For every 100 females, there were 104.7 males. For every 100 females age 18 and over, there were 105.5 males.

The median income for a household in the town was $46,154, and the median income for a family was $51,402. Males had a median income of $36,204 versus $30,255 for females. The per capita income for the town was $23,995. About 4.9% of families and 6.1% of the population were below the poverty line, including 8.0% of those under age 18 and 6.1% of those age 65 or over.

Government
The Town of Groton has a Town Council consisting of 9 members, along with a Representative Town Meeting.  The Town has a Town Council/Town Manager form of Government.  The current Mayor is Juan Melendez.  The current Town Manager is John Burt.

Industry

There are two major companies in Groton: General Dynamics Electric Boat and Pfizer. The Electric Boat plant on the eastern shore of the Thames River employs 10,500 people in the community. Pfizer is one of the world's largest pharmaceutical companies, and the company maintains a  research and development facility in Groton.

Top employers

According to the Town's 2010 Comprehensive Annual Financial Report, the top employers are:

Education
There are many schools in the Groton area.

Public schools
Groton Public Schools is the local school district serving Groton, operating elementary, middle and high school locations.

Independent high schools
Marine Science Magnet High School
E.T. Grasso/Southeastern Technical High School, a technical school which serves Groton and surrounding communities

Higher education
Avery Point campus of the University of Connecticut

Transportation
Groton is served by Southeast Area Transit District, the local area bus service district. Through SEAT, there are connections to neighboring New London, CT and Norwich, CT. Despite there being a freight rail line running through Groton off of the Northeast Corridor, there is no passenger rail service serving Groton at this time. The nearest passenger rail station is across the Thames River in New London, CT, being served by Amtrak and the CT DOT's Shoreline East commuter service.

Air travel is provided by Groton-New London Airport, a state-owned public-use airport in the southeast section of Groton. Since 2004, Groton-New London has not had scheduled passenger service, but has intermittently offered charter services with small local airlines. The nearest airports providing scheduled passenger service are Rhode Island T.F. Green International Airport in Rhode Island, and Bradley International Airport in Hartford.

Notable people

 Robert G. Albion (1896–1983), influential maritime historian who died in Groton
 Brian Anderson (born 1976), professional skateboarder
 James Avery (1620–1700), captain of the New London militia company during King Philip's War
 Waightstill Avery (1741–1821), North Carolina politician, soldier in the American Revolutionary War, participant in a duel with Andrew Jackson
 James Cook Ayer (1818–1878), patent medicine businessman and industrialist
 Anna Warner Bailey (1758–1851), popular revolutionary hero
 Ambrose Burfoot (born 1946), marathoner who grew up in Groton
 Latham A. Burrows, former State Senator
 Lorenzo Burrows, former US Congressman
 Dave Campo, NFL coach and a graduate of Fitch Senior High School
 Nathan Daboll (1780–1863), politician, judge, textbook author, and almanac publisher
 Silas Deane (1737–1789), delegate to the Continental Congress and the United States' first foreign diplomat; born in Groton
 Jesse Hahn (born 1989), Oakland Athletics Pitcher, and a graduate of Fitch Senior High School
 George Hall, Arena Football League player, 2008, graduate of Fitch Senior High School
 Matt Harvey (born 1989), New York Mets Pitcher, graduate of Fitch Senior High School
 John J. Kelley (1930–2011), winner of the 1957 Boston Marathon, member of two U.S. Olympic marathon teams
 Husband E. Kimmel (1882–1968), U.S. Navy admiral and commander of the Pacific Fleet at the time of attack on Pearl Harbor, died in Groton
 John Ledyard (1751–1789), international explorer born in Groton
 William Ledyard (1738–1781), commander of Fort Griswold and killed in the attack on it
 Fran Mainella, National Park Service Director, 2001–2006, graduate of Fitch Senior High School
 Paul Menhart, former Toronto Blue Jays pitcher, graduate of Fitch Senior High School
 Lou Palazzi (1921–2007), NFL player and umpire born in Groton
 Thomas Rogers (1792–1856), builder of innovative locomotives, born in Groton
 Samuel Seabury (1729–1796), first American Episcopal bishop, born in Groton
 Elijah F. Smith, 8th mayor of Rochester, New York
 Tookoolito (1838–1876), famous Inuit guide to Arctic explorers, lived in Groton and is buried there in the Starr Burying Ground
 Cassin Young (1894–1942), U.S. Navy officer awarded the Medal of Honor

Points of interest
 Branford House and Alexey von Schlippe Gallery of Art
 Fort Griswold
 Groton Monument, one of the oldest obelisks in the United States
 Gungywamp archaeological site
 New London Ledge Light
 Pequot Fort
 Jabez Smith House
 U.S. Navy Submarine Force Library and Museum, including 
 Edward Yeomans House

Gallery

See also

References

External links

 Town of Groton official website

 
Towns in New London County, Connecticut
Populated places established in 1705
1705 establishments in Connecticut
Towns in Connecticut
Populated coastal places in Connecticut
Populated places on the Thames River (Connecticut)